Dupuya madagascariensis is a species of legume in the family Fabaceae. It is found only in Madagascar.

References

Amburaneae
Endemic flora of Madagascar
Near threatened plants
Taxonomy articles created by Polbot
Flora of the Madagascar dry deciduous forests
Flora of the Madagascar succulent woodlands